Sergei Telegin (born 21 September 2000) is a Russian professional ice hockey defenseman for Traktor Chelyabinsk of the Kontinental Hockey League (KHL).

Playing career
Telegin made his professional debut for Traktor Chelyabinsk during the 2020–21 season.

International play

On 23 January 2022, Telegin was named to the roster to represent Russian Olympic Committee athletes at the 2022 Winter Olympics.

Career statistics

Regular season and playoffs

International

References

External links
 

2000 births
Living people
Chelmet Chelyabinsk players
HC Yugra players
Mamonty Yugry players
Russian ice hockey defencemen
Sportspeople from Chelyabinsk
Traktor Chelyabinsk players
Olympic ice hockey players of Russia
Ice hockey players at the 2022 Winter Olympics
Medalists at the 2022 Winter Olympics
Olympic silver medalists for the Russian Olympic Committee athletes
Olympic medalists in ice hockey